Theodor Severin Kittelsen (27 April 1857 – 21 January 1914) was a Norwegian artist.  He is one of the most popular artists in Norway.  Kittelsen became famous for his nature paintings, as well as for his illustrations of fairy tales and legends, especially of trolls.

Early life
Kittelsen was born in the coastal town of Kragerø in Grenland, Norway. His father died when he was young, leaving a wife and eight children in difficult circumstances. Theodor was only 11 years old when he was apprenticed to a watchmaker. When at the age of 17 his talent was discovered by Diderich Maria Aall, he became a pupil at Wilhelm von Hannos drawing school in Christiania (now Oslo). Because of generous financial support by Aall he later  studied in  Munich. However, in 1879 Diderich Aall could no longer manage to support him, so Kittelsen had to earn his money as a draftsman for German newspapers and magazines.

Career
In 1882 Kittelsen was granted a state scholarship to study in Paris. In 1887 he returned to Norway for good.  When back in Norway, he found nature to be a great inspiration.  He spent the next two years in Lofoten where he lived with his sister and brother-in-law at Skomvær Lighthouse. Kittelsen also started to write texts to his drawings there.

Kittelsen and his family settled in a home and artist studio which he called Lauvlia near Prestfoss during 1899, he spent his best artistic years here. During this period, Kittelsen was hired to illustrate Norwegian Folktales (Norwegian: Norske Folkeeventyr) by the Norwegian folklore collector Peter Christen Asbjørnsen and Jørgen Moe. In 1908 he was made Knight of The Royal Norwegian Order of St. Olav. However, he was forced to sell and leave Lauvlia in 1910 due to failing health. Kittelsen was granted an artist’s stipend in 1911; he died in Jeløya in 1914. After his death, his widow Inga Kittelsen was granted an annual salary from the Storting.

Style
Kittelsen's style had elements of  Neo-Romantic and naïve painting. As a national artist he is highly respected and well known in Norway, but doesn't receive much international attention, which is the reason that his name is often not included in registers of internationally recognized painters and artists.

Dedicated museums
Lauvlia, his home from 1899 to 1910, is located in Sigdal north of Prestfoss along Highway Fv287, with scenic view of Lake Soneren. The surrounding area, in particular Mount Andersnatten which overlooks the lake a few kilometres north, inspired some of Kittelsen's most famous landscapes. Today Lauvlia is a private museum featuring an exhibition of Kittelsen’s original work. Lauvlia is decorated with Kittelsen's own woodcarvings and murals. A new exhibition of original Kittelsen works is opened each year with painting and drawing activities arranged for children. The paintings exhibited are rotated each year.
 Theodor Kittelsen Museum at Blaafarveværket is at the Skuterudhøyden ridge by the Cobalt Mines. Kittelsen’s poetical interpretations of nature, the forest, the mountains and trolls are presented in the form of carved furniture, oil paintings, watercolours and drawings. New exhibitions each year. In 2014 are Blaafarveværket in charge of arranging the biggest exhibition held ever in modern times.
The house where the artist grew up in Kragerø is also currently a museum devoted to his legacy.

Cultural references
Black metal and folk metal bands such as Burzum, Empyrium, Otyg and Satyricon have used some of his pictures as album art, notably illustrations taken from Kittelsen's book Svartedauen (The Black Death). Musician Phil Elverum named the tenth song on his 2017 album A Crow Looked at Me after Kittelesen's painting "Soria Moria" specifically, using it as an illustration of his grief. Kittelsen's 160th birthday was celebrated in a Google doodle on 27 April 2017, giving him some exposure outside of Norway.

Paintings and drawings

Illustrations for Svartedauen (Black Death)

Bibliography 
Books illustrated by Theodor Kittelsen:
 Fra Livet i de smaa Forholde I-II (1889–1890)
 Fra Lofoten I-II (1890–1891)
 Troldskab (1892)
 Glemmebogen (1892)
 Har dyrene Sjæl? (1894)
 Kludesamleren (1894)
 Im Thierstaate (1896)
 Ordsprog (1898)
 Svartedauen (1900)
 Billeder og Ord (1901)
 Folk og trold. Minder og drømme (1911)
 Soria Moria slot (1911)
 Løgn og forbandet digt (1912)
 Heimskringla (1914)

References

Other sources
 Holger Koefoed  (1994)  Møter med Th. Kittelsen (Oslo: Gyldendal Tiden)

External links 

 
  The big size Kittelsen's illustrations
 Trollmoon - a site dedicated to the Scandinavian Troll in Art and Folklore incl. Kittelsen
 Theodor Kittelsen's home in Sigdal, Norway (museum)
 A huge gallery of Kittelsen's works
 Kittelsen's work in the collection of The National Museum of Art, Architecture and Design, Oslo

1857 births
1914 deaths
People from Kragerø
Norwegian illustrators
Norwegian children's book illustrators
19th-century Norwegian painters
20th-century Norwegian painters
Norwegian male painters
Norwegian male writers
People from Buskerud
20th-century illustrators of fairy tales
People from Sigdal
19th-century Norwegian male artists
20th-century Norwegian male artists